Dhanushkodi railway station is an abandoned railway station in Tamil Nadu, India. It was abandoned during the 1964 Rameswaram cyclone. It is one of the two branch lines gets diverted from Pamban Junction one is Pamban Junction Rameswaram Branch line and the other is Pamban Junction Dhanushkodi Branch line. Both lines got destroyed in that cyclone. Immediately after the cyclone, Rameswaram branch line was constructed and opened to traffic but Dhanushkodi branch line is not yet constructed. Now funds are being raised to reconstruct this line.

References

External links

Railway stations in Ramanathapuram district
Defunct railway stations in India
Railway stations closed in 1964
Transport in Rameswaram
Madurai railway division